Caulker may refer to:

Caulking
Caulker (surname)
Caye Caulker, an island in the Caribbean Sea